The 1916 The Citadel Bulldogs football team represented The Citadel in the 1916 Southern Intercollegiate Athletic Association football season. Led by first-year head coach Harry J. O'Brien, the Bulldogs compiled an overall record of 6–1–1 with a mark of 3–1 in SIAA play. The Citadel claims a "State Championship" for 1916 by virtue of its wins over Presbyterian, Clemson, and South Carolina. The Bulldogs played home games at College Park Stadium in Hampton Park.

Schedule

References

Citadel
The Citadel Bulldogs football seasons
Citadel Bulldogs football